The 2022 European Rowing U-19 Championships took place in Varese, Italy, between 21 and 22 May 2022. The age category was renamed from Junior to Under 19 at the end of 2020, and come into effect at the end of 2021.

Medalists

Medal table 
Source:

Participants 
A total of 917 rowers from the national teams of the following 29 countries was registered to compete at 2022 European Rowing U-19 Championships.

 (2 in 1 event)
 (8 in 3 events)
 (1 in 1 event)
 (1 in 1 event)
 (5 in 2 events)
 (17 in 5 events)
 (25 in 6 events)
 (9 in 4 events)
 (9 in 3 events)
 (32 in 9 events)
 (5 in 3 events)
 (2 in 2 events)
 (1 in 1 event)
 (21 in 8 events)
 (23 in 9 events)
 (49 in 13 events)
 (4 in 1 event)
 (10 in 3 events)
 (6 in 4 events)
 (3 in 2 events)
 (25 in 6 events)
 (4 in 1 event)
 (43 in 11 events)
 (8 in 4 events)
 (8 in 3 events)
 (21 in 6 events)
 (1 in 1 event)
 (16 in 3 events)
 (32 in 6 events)

External links 
 Saturday results summary
 Sunday results summary

References 

2022 in rowing
Rowing
Rowing
Rowing competitions in Italy
Sport in Varese
European Rowing U-19 Championships